Turbonilla migueloi is a species of sea snail, a marine gastropod mollusk in the family Pyramidellidae, the pyrams and their allies.

Description
The shell reaches a length of 2.3 mm.

Distribution
This species occurs in the Pacific Ocean off the Solomons, Vanuatu and Tonga

References

External links
 To Encyclopedia of Life
 To World Register of Marine Species

migueloi
Gastropods described in 2010